Caenurgina caerulea, the cerulean looper moth, is a moth of the family Erebidae. It is found in large parts of North America, including California, and British Columbia.

References

External links

Moths of North America
Moths described in 1873
Caenurgina